Corpach railway station is a railway station serving the village of Corpach in the Highland region of Scotland. This station is on the West Highland Line, between Banavie and Loch Eil Outward Bound, and is sited  from Banavie Junction, near Fort William. ScotRail, whop manage the station, operate all services.

History 
Corpach station opened on 1 April 1901. Loch Eil lies immediately to the south of the station. 

The station was host to a LNER camping coach from 1936 to 1939. A camping coach was also positioned here by the Scottish Region from 1961 to 1969, the coach was a Pullman camping coach until 1964 and a standard one thereafter, all camping coaches in the region were withdrawn at the end of the 1969 season.

Facilities 

The single platform has a shelter, a bench and some bike racks. There is step-free access to a small car park. As there are no facilities to purchase tickets, passengers must buy one in advance, or from the guard on the train.

Passenger volume 

The statistics cover twelve month periods that start in April.

Services 
Four services call here each way on weekdays & Saturdays, and three on Sundays.

References

Bibliography

External links

 RAILSCOT on Mallaig Extension Railway
Video footage of Corpach Station

Railway stations in Highland (council area)
Former North British Railway stations
Railway stations in Great Britain opened in 1901
Railway stations served by ScotRail